300 Park Avenue South (previously the Mills & Gibb Building and currently also known as The Creative Arts Center) is a building on the northwest corner of East 22nd Street in the Flatiron District/Gramercy Park neighborhoods of Manhattan, New York City.

History
The 16-story Beaux-Arts style building was to a design by Starrett & van Vleck. The Beaux-Arts style building was completed in 1911. Its automatic sprinklers were supplied with water by two steel pressure tanks of  capacity each, located in a fireproof house on the roof. They were connected together, with gate and check valves at each, and discharge through a dead riser running down through the building to the basement. The ornamental iron partitions glazed with wire mesh glass that separated each floor from the main stairway were furnished by the Winslow Brothers' Company. "Richardson" seamless kalamein fire doors protected the openings on the passenger elevator shaft. furnished by the J. F. Blanchard Company, these doors were finished with Verdi antique enamel. The entire steel frame was fireproofed with terra cotta hollow tile furnished by Henry Maurer & Son, New York City.

It is currently occupied by the Smithsonian Institution's New York Research Center, the New York State Council on the Arts, Wilhelmina Models, FanDuel, and the Whitney Museum of American Art. Rockrose Development Corporation is the landlord.

References
Notes

Sources

External links

Commercial buildings completed in 1911
Flatiron District
Park Avenue
Mills & Gibb
Gramercy Park
1911 establishments in New York City
Beaux-Arts architecture in New York City